Toward a New Philosophy of Biology: Observations of an Evolutionist (published by Harvard University Press, Cambridge, Massachusetts, in 1988) is a book by Harvard evolutionary biologist Ernst Mayr.

A collection of 28 essays, five previously unpublished, grouped into ten categories—Philosophy, Natural Selection, Adaptation, Darwin, Diversity, Species, Speciation, Macroevolution, and Historical Perspective. The book, Mayr notes in the Forward, is an attempt "to strengthen the bridge between biology and philosophy, and point to the new direction in which a new philosophy of biology will move."

Reviews
 Ayala, Francisco J. Science, New Series, Vol. 240, No. 4860 (June, 1988).
 Griesemer, James R. The Quarterly Review of Biology, Vol. 64, No. 1 (March, 1989).
 Maienschein, Jane. Isis, Vol. 80, No. 3 (September, 1989).
 Smith, John Maynard. New York Review of Books, Volume 39, Number 9, May 14, 1992.

1988 non-fiction books
American essay collections
Harvard University Press books
Biology books
Philosophy books